is a racing video game developed and published by Real Vision in Japan on July 27, 2000 for Dreamcast.

Gameplay
The player controls a chariot drawn by robotic animals around courses on land, sea or in the air. Weapons can be equipped in the game, but only in the Battle Mode.

References

External links
Zusar Vasar at IGN
Zusar Vasar at GameFAQs

2000 video games
Dreamcast games
Dreamcast-only games
Japan-exclusive video games
Racing video games
Multiplayer and single-player video games
Video games developed in Japan